Antonio Bezerra Brandão or simply Toninho (born December 21, 1977), is a former Brazilian central defender.

Club statistics

External links 

sambafoot
CBF
placar

1977 births
Living people
Brazilian footballers
Brazilian expatriate footballers
Associação Ferroviária de Esportes players
J1 League players
J2 League players
Centro Sportivo Alagoano players
Sport Club Corinthians Paulista players
Clube Atlético Juventus players
Expatriate footballers in Japan
Omiya Ardija players
Paraná Clube players
Agremiação Sportiva Arapiraquense players
Sociedade Esportiva e Recreativa Caxias do Sul players
Rio Claro Futebol Clube players
Grêmio Barueri Futebol players
Esporte Clube XV de Novembro (Piracicaba) players
Association football defenders